Arc Rise Fantasia is a 2009 role-playing video game co-developed by Imageepoch and Marvelous Entertainment for the Wii. It was published in Japan by Marvelous Entertainment in 2009 and in North America by Ignition Entertainment in 2010. A planned European release through Rising Star Games was cancelled. The storyline, set in a fantasy world split between hostile factions beset by attacks from destructive Feldragons, protagonist L'Arc Bright Lagoon allies with the priestess Ryfia after he is chosen as a Child of Easa who will remake the world. Gameplay features a growing party led by L'Arc navigating both an overworld and dungeon environments, taking part in turn-based battles.

Production lasted three years, with Nintendo approaching the developers to create an RPG for the Wii. The team included Tales scenario writer Takumi Miyajima, and artists Kenichi Yoshida and Shin Nagasawa. The music was a collaborative effort between Yasunori Mitsuda, Shunsuke Tsuchiya and Yuki Harada, with the theme song written and performed by Ryfia's voice actress Yui Makino. Debuting to poor sales, the game saw a mixed reaction from critics, with most of the praise going towards its battle system. A recurring complaint was the localization and English dub, with Ignition later admitting its poor quality and changing its localization partners.

Gameplay

Arc Rise Fantasia is a role-playing video game where players principally take on the role of protagonist L'Arc Bright Lagoon and a growing party of companions. The story is communicated through full motion cutscenes using CGI or in-game character models, visual novel-like voiced sequences showing dialogue between characters represented as portraits, and text-based "Skits" activated by the player during exploration. Controlling L'Arc, the player navigates overworld zones, and more detailed dungeon and town environments. In towns, the party can interact with shop keepers to buy supplies and items such as weapons and armor or accessories. Guilds found through the game give access to side quests. The player can also engage in a slot machine minigame to win powerful equipment and items using special coins found during exploration. Similar rare items and equipment can be earned by defeating special monsters in dungeons.

Combat is triggered upon running into an enemy sprite in a dungeon or overworld, with player or enemy ambushes impacting the party's starting performance. The battle system, dubbed the "Trinity Battle System", uses turn-based mechanics, with the party and enemies each getting opportunities to act; the player's party is limited to three, with an AI-controlled fourth character joining during certain story-driven sections. Actions available to the party are attacking, defending, using skills and equipped magic, passing or moving their turn which changes that character's position in the turn order, and using an item. All combatants draw on a shared pool of Action Points (AP), with all actions requiring AP and one character able to take multiple turns. Magic spells require both AP and magic points to cast successfully. If a party member is knocked out, the AP meter shrinks, though skills are eeduced in price to compensate. Characters can be individually controlled, or the player can us an AI command menu to preset the two secondary party members.

Each character has a character class which dictates their strengths and ability growth. Several mechanics revolve around character cooperation. Using two consecutive identical spells on an enemy triggers "Tandem Sync", allowing a free follow-up attack regardless of the turn order and triggering a combo, additionally granting special effects such as increased AP during the next turn. Magic is learned and equipped using Orbs slotted into a character's weapon, with the slot being limited by its size and the shape of Orbs; Orbs degrade over time and must be repaired in towns. Special character skills called Excel Arts are fuelled by another resource called SP. The most powerful are Trinity Acts, when a set of three Excel Arts are chained together to perform a powerful combined move. Some characters can also summon Rogress, magical beings with powerful attacks that draw on their own power metre which fills up during battle. Defeating an enemy grants experience points and in-game currency.

Synopsis

Setting and characters
Arc Rise Fantasia is set in the fantasy world of Fulheim, which is split between three competing political factions; the Meridian Empire, the Turmelian Republic, and a theocratic alliance of countries dubbed Olquina which is controlling the flow of a vital energy called Ray. All three are worshippers of the creator deity Easa, espousing different interpretations of the Law dubbed the Real and Imaginal. Legend says that Easa must be presented with a chosen version of the Law to form the foundation of the world; it is later revealed that the Real Law advocates destroying the current world to create a new one, while the Imaginal Law seeks the continuation of the current world. Each faction has a priestess of Easa dubbed a Diva, who have magical powers based on their song. In recent years flocks of monsters called Feldragons have started appearing, and parts of the world are being crystalized by an energy called Hozon.

The main protagonist is L'Arc Bright Lagoon, a noted mercenary working with the Empire who has a taciturn personality. He partners at an early point with Ryfia, the Imaginal Diva of the Turmelian Republic whose sheltered upbringing leaves her socially awkward. L'Arc is childhood friends with Alfonse "Alf" Zena Meridia, current heir to the Imperial throne after his brother Weiss Dona Meridia, and Adele Nevanlinna who has secret affection for L'Arc. L'Arc is joined during the campaign by Cecille Garcia, a young girl with combat skills; Serge, a flirtatious mercenary thief; Leslie Ferrati, an agent from the Republic; and Rastan Oigen, an enigmatic swordsman. Recurring characters are Niko Bennex, a notoriously cowardly Imperial soldier; and Luze, a wandering priestess. Among the antagonists is Dynos, a man with power to command the undead; Ignacy, a leader of the political and criminal underworld; and Hosea, Patriarch of the Imaginal faith.

Plot
During an air battle between an Imperial fleet and a flock of Feldragons, L'Arc falls to earth with a defeated Feldragon. He is saved from the Feldragon's explosive death explosion by Ryfia, who disperses the Feldragon with her song. They later meet up with Alphonse and Niko, and see Rastan fighting Dylon with both escaping in the chaos. Ryfia leaves for the nearby forbidden Feldragon Prison, with L'Arc and Alphonse following and the three forced to enter when ambushed by Dymos. Ryfia locates the Rogress Simmah inside, and L'Arc resonates with her power and becomes Child of Easa representing the Imaginal Law. Simmah then vanishes, the Empire's remaining Ray supply vanishes, and the three are arrested. Weiss forces L'Arc and Ryfia on a mission into Olquina to deactivate a device blocking Ray from the Empire. L'Arc's home is then attacked by thieves hired by Lunacy to steal Adele's pendant. Serge, who was among the thieves, helps the party reach Olquina on the ship, briefly encountering Leslie and destroying the device while narrowly escaping Dymos.

Adele is then kidnapped, and Leslie teams up with the group to rescue her. They discover her awakened as Diva of the Real Law, awakening the Rogress Girtab. Imperial ships then attack Olquina, with Weiss appearing in person to kill Adele, attacking both L'Arc and Alphonse when they try to stop him. L'Arc is forced to summon Simmah, which injures Adele and triggers Alphonse to awaken as a second Child of Easa aligned to the Real Law. Adele snaps and tries to kill them all with Girtab, but Alphonse stops Girtab and leaves with Adele, Dymos, and Serge and Leslie who were working for or aligned with the Real Law. Weiss, who despises both the Laws, gives L'Arc a final mission to go as an emissary to the Republic. Travelling with Niko and Cecille and crossing the border with Luze's help, the group are arrested upon delivering the message, a request for unconditional surrender to the Empire. The four escape with help from Rastan, and taking shelter in the remains of Ryfia's home under the protection of Hosea. There they learn that L'Arc can stop the Hozone's effects on the world by gathering nine Rogress and ascending to Easa's holy land of Noire to enact the Imaginal Law.

During their journey, the party learn that a thousand years before the Feldragons appeared, a Hozone blight nearly wiped out the early Divine Race, who fled into hibernation under Easa's guidance; Cecille, Rastan and Dynos are of the Divine Race. The Imaginal Law resulted in the birth of the current Common Race, designed to survive the remaining Hozone. They also encounter Adele's party, with Alphonse stirring up support within the Republic and Empire against Weiss and bonding with other Rogress. After gathering enough power, L'Arc fights both the Imperial forces led by Weiss, revealed to have been cursed by Easa, and corruption within the Republic orchestrated by Ignacy and Hosea to further the Imaginal Law. Serge and Leslie eventually join L'Arc as he proves his willingness to save people on all sides of the conflict. L'Arc learns that Easa is an artificial being with a human at its core, and if the Imaginal Law is enacted to destroy Hozone the Common Race will die out, while Feldragons are being created from Divine Race members corrupted by Hozone. Lunacy, while of the Common Race, is among those furthering the Imaginal Law as he has struck a bargain with Easa's worshippers. Luze is the current core of Easa, watching the current Children of Easa to see which Law will be enacted.

Adele orchestrates Weiss's death at Alphonse's hands to further her agenda, with Weiss revealing L'Arc to be his illegitimate brother and a descendent of both Divine and Common Races. L'Arc decides to create a new Law which will allow both Races to exist. Ignacy and Hosea kidnap Niko to force Alphonse and L'Arc to give up their power and create a new Child of Easa. Adele sacrifices herself to save Alphonse, and the party kill Lunacy and Hosea, with Niko sacrificing himself to stop a Divine Race weapon. A disillusioned Alphonse opens the way to the Real Law's core to fulfil Adele's wish. The party have final duels with Alphonse's followers including Dynos, then against Alphonse himself, persuading Alphonse to let them confront Easa. Alphonse gives them his Rogress, then destroys the Real Law core, awakening Easa's true form. The party confront Luze, being forced to kill her so L'Arc can take her place as Easa's core and neutralise Hozone's toxicity so both Common and Divine Races can live together. The process takes five centuries, with his companions vowing to improve the world in his absence. When he awakens, he finds Ryfia hibernated to remain by his side.

Development
Arc Rise Fantasia was a co-production between Imageepoch and Marvelous Entertainment, the latter acting as publisher. They had previously worked together on Imageepoch's first game Luminous Arc (2007). Imageepoch founder and CEO Ryoei Mikage acted as co-producer with Marvelous's Hideyuki Mizutani. Mikage had been introduced to Mizutani through a mutual friend, and during production on the Luminous Arc series, they were approached by Nintendo about making an RPG for the Wii, which had a deficit of that genre. The team accepted, wanting to pay tribute to other notable RPG series of the time, which had their origins on Nintendo consoles. Mizutani had also long wished to produce an RPG. Mikage's target audience for the game was the "hardcore" RPG demographic. The production was described as a highly collaborative effort between the different divisions, with each bringing up ideas for making the game and putting effort and care into the final product. Initially known under the codename "Project Ray", production lasted three years. Many of the lead production staff, which included several notable names, was assembled quickly due to pre-existing working relationships with Imageepoch. Mizutani attributed the development of Luminous Arc with bringing together the staff who would create Arc Rise Fantasia. Among the team were several veterans of the Tales series, including director Hiroyuki Kanemaru. When Kanemaru came on board, the game's platform had already been decided; he joined when a mutual acquaintance directed him towards Imageepoch, and he found the project had several former co-workers already involved.

As with Imageepoch's other titles, the game used a fantasy setting. The narrative was the first part of the game to be created, with the team wanting a unique worldview with memorable characters and a wide range of emotion. To this end the team brought in Takumi Miyajima, who had previously written the scenarios of Tales of Symphonia (2003) and Tales of the Abyss (2005). Takumi Miyajima is credited as both scenario supervisor, and co-writer alongside Miyuki Kishimoto, Toru Shizuki and Kohei Ohta. The slogan Mizutani created for the scenario was "Let's make an RPG that will make you cry", with Mikage also requesting a scenario that would make players weep. The team looked for inspiration to multiple anime series, with Code Geass being cited as a particular inspiration for the emotional tone. They also wanted the cast to reflect recent trends of character development in anime and manga, feeling that video games had not caught up. There were some delays finalizing the scenario, delaying the rest of production by six months. Prior to release, the team were drafting plans for a potential trilogy, with the sequels depending on the first game's sales.

The character design drafts were created by Kenichi Yoshida, known for his work on the anime series Eureka Seven. In contrast to the other lead developers, it took time to bring Yoshida on board as the team wanted character designs unlike those seen in other games at the time. Mizutani personally met up with Yoshida several times over two months, eventually persuading him to come on board. The team considered Yoshida's style as best fitting with the planned scenario. Creating 3D versions of Yoshida's designs, particularly lead protagonist L'Arc, was a difficult process that Kanemaru had to supervise in person. The Rogress summons were designed by Etrian Odyssey artist Shin Nagasawa.

The battle design was led by Osamu Hisano. The programmer was Takashi Kawamoto, who would later work as a battle designer on Final Fantasy XIV: Shadowbringers. While the team overall wanted something new and innovative, being another area where they felt the video game industry was being slow to change, they also kept many traditional elements in the gameplay so as not to alienate genre fans. The gameplay design drew a lot of inspiration from Tales of Symphonia, which many staff members had fond memories of working on. The controls were designed to be traditional rather than relying on the console's motion controls, allowing for long play sessions. The combat system was created around the concept of what Mikage called "link-up combat". The three-person party was considered the best balance, allowing the mechanics and AI to work the smoothest. The team wanted to keep the battles as low-stress as possible, though flashy animations and special attack cutscenes were added at Marvelous's request. The large overworld was planned from an early stage at Kanemaru's insistence, contrasting against selectable self-contained locations on other Wii RPGs. Adjustments to the gameplay were happening late into development, with Mikage focusing on making the battle system as fast and enjoyable as possible within the turn-based system they chose. Keeping loading times as short as possible was also a consideration.

Music

The music was produced by Yasunori Mitsuda, also founder and head of independent music company Procyon Studio; the group had previously worked with Imageepoch on Luminous Arc. Mitsuda co-composed the score with Shunsuke Tsuchiya, also of Procyon Studio, and Yuki Harada. The soundtrack remains Harada's only video game work. As was his policy at this time, Mitsuda refused to compose music for the game until it was complete, allowing him to match his score to the finished product. He also noted that the music was in a style unlike his previous RPG compositions. The soundtrack was themed around "light", which was a recurring story and visual motif. Tsuchiya described his work as mostly focusing on battle themes, and attributed pieces with rock elements to Harada. Tsuchiya also arranged two tracks from Luminous Arc 2 composed by Yoko Shimomura. Tsuchiya considered Arc Rise Fantasia both his most challenging project due to the work load and fan anticipation, and the "culmination" of his skills up to then.

The ending theme, "Angel Stairs ~crepuscular rays~", was written and performed by Ryfia's Japanese voice actress Yui Makino, and arranged by Tsuneyoshi Saito. Makino requested to Mizutani that she write the theme after reading the scenario, with Mizutani agreeing after hearing a demo she put together. The theme was performed by Makino in Japanese, with chorus in Latin by Hanae Tomaru. Makino also provided vocals for several in-game themes, sung in a fictional language. Makino described these themes as challenging to sing due to the non-standard rhythms. The theme "Song of Ruin" was performed by Emiri Katō, Japanese voice of Adele. A licensed theme, "Negai Hoshi" performed by Nami Tamaki and later released both as a digital release and as part of her single Friends!, was used in promotional trailers.

A selection of thirteen tracks were released as a pre-order bonus. A 3-CD soundtrack album was published by Team Entertainment on March 3, 2010. There was originally no album planned, though Mitsuda raised the possibility of tracks appearing on compilation albums. The full album was produced based on requests from fans of the soundtrack.

Release
Arc Rise Fantasia was announced in June 2008. The game was Imageepoch's first game developed for home consoles, with their previous work being for the portable Nintendo DS. It was exhibited in playable form at the 2008 Tokyo Game Show. Part of the game's promotion was radio programs distributed through the game website with some of the Japanese cast. It was released in Japan on June 4, 2009. The official website opened on March 6 of that year, featuring information on the game and links to a developer blog. As a pre-order bonus when orders opened in March of that year, Marvelous created the "Arc Light Symphony", a media collection featuring a soundtrack selection, an art book with developer comments, and a booklet featuring both behind-the-scenes material and a prequel novella written by Miyajima. To conform with the game's CERO rating, the character Leslie's outfit was made less revealing than seen in pre-rating media. A complete strategy guide was released by Enterbrain on August 12.

A Western localization was confirmed by Marvelous in 2008, with the original plan being for a release through their partnership with Xseed Games. Mikage confirmed following the Japanese release that Imageepoch was collaborating on the localization. By October 2009, Marvelous made the decision to have Arc Rise Fantasia published in North America by Ignition Entertainment. The stated reason given by Xseed was Marvellous wanting to "increase its overall profitability" by licensing the publishing to a third party. The game released in the United States on June 27, 2010. It was originally announced for a European release through regular Marvelous partner Rising Star Games, but in 2011 Rising Star confirmed that the game would not be released in Europe.

The translation and localization were handled by Japanese company Entalize. Entalize was at that time a frequent collaborator of Ignition whose work on Nostalgia (2008) and Muramasa: The Demon Blade (2009) had met with criticism compared to other localizations of the time. Due to disc space limitations, the Japanese voice track could not be included with the English release. Another cited issue was Ignition being unable to secure the rights to the Japanese dub. Prior to release, Ignition's Shane Bettenhausen defended the dub as being "on par, but maybe not the level" with other titles such as the Final Fantasy series, citing the localization as a challenge due to the early work done by Xseed needing to be worked with. In a later 2011 interview, Bettenhausen noted that due to the negative reactions to the dub, Ignition would not work with Entalize again. In both interviews, Bettenhausen stated that Ignition had learned lessons from the localization of Arc Rise Fantasia, taking a different approach with their future localizations such as El Shaddai: Ascension of the Metatron.

Reception

During its first week on sale, Arc Rise Fantasia debuted in fourth place in gaming charts, selling 26,000 units. By the end of the year, the game had sold just over 49,000 units. Speaking on the poor Japanese sales, Marvelous's Yasuhiro Wada noted that third-party products for the Wii were historically difficult to sell compared to first-party Nintendo products. The game failed to break into the top twenty best-selling games in North America during its release week.

The game received "mixed" reviews according to the review aggregation website Metacritic; the game's turn-based battle gameplay (something of a rarity for the Wii) was praised whilst the game's tendency to stick to established JRPG formulas were criticized. Proponents of the game, such as Nintendo Power, cited that the game's strong points overshadowed its faults.

The English localization of the game received criticism directed towards its technical problems, but it is somewhat infamous for its voice acting which is criticized by many as being lazy. In Japan, Famitsu gave it a score of all four eights for a total of 32 out of 40.

References

Notes

External links
  
 

Fantasy video games
Marvelous Entertainment games
Video games developed in Japan
Wii-only games
Role-playing video games
Image Epoch games
Wii games
2009 video games
Video games scored by Yasunori Mitsuda
Single-player video games
UTV Ignition Games games